Kenrick–Glennon Seminary (officially Saint Louis Roman Catholic Theological Seminary) is a Roman Catholic seminary in Shrewsbury, Missouri that is operated by the Archdiocese of Saint Louis. The seminary was founded in 1818 and is named named after Archbishop Peter Richard Kenrick and Cardinal John J. Glennon, two former archbishops of Saint Louis.

Kenrick–Glennon has two college-level divisions to educate and prepare seminarians for ordination as priests.  Its students come from many archdioceses and dioceses.

 Cardinal Glennon College is the undergraduate division.  It offers a Bachelor of Arts (B.A.) degree in philosophy.
 Kenrick School of Theology is the graduate division.  It offer a Master of Divinity degree (M.Div.) and a Master of Arts degree in theology (M.A.),   It also offers a pre-theology program for men with undergraduate degrees who need 30 hours of philosophy to enter the graduate program.

History
Kenrick-Glennon traces its origins to the first seminary in the region, which opened in 1818. Since then, it has changed name, location and programs numerous times to meet the changing needs of seminarians.

19th century 
Kenrick–Glennon Seminary began in 1818 as Saint Mary's of the Barrens Seminary in Perryville, Missouri.  Founded by the Vicentians order, it was the first Catholic seminary in American territory west of the Mississippi River. In 1842, then Bishop Kenrick established a major seminary in St. Louis.  The Perryville facility remained a minor seminary.  Due to problems with the seminary house in St. Louis, Kenrick move the major seminary to Carondelet, Missouri in 1848; it became known as the Carondelet Seminary.  In 1858, the major and minor seminaries both moved to Cape Giradeau, Missouri, to become Saint Vincent College.  However, the American Civil War in the 1860s caused a drop in enrollment, curtailing the formation programs there.

In 1893, then bishop John Kain reestablished the major seminary in St. Louis by starting college programs in philosophy and theology;  the new college was named Kenrick Seminary.

20th century 
In 1900, Kain reestablished the minor seminary in the same building as Kenrick Seminary, calling it the Kenrick Preparatory Seminary.  Archbishop Glennon moved Kenrick Preparatory Seminary in 1915 to a larger campus in Shrewsbury.  The facility suffered extensive tornado damage in 1927.

In 1931, the Vincentians opened Saint Louis Preparatory Seminary at the Shrewsbury campus.  Saint Louis provided the last two years of high school with four years of college.  Kenrick Preparatory Seminary now became Cathedral Latin School, a four year high school program.  In 1947, Archbishop Joseph Ritter reorganized the seminary programs yet again:

 Closing Cathedral Latin school
 Keeping Kenrick Seminary  as a four-year school of theology
 Changing St. Louis Preparatory Seminary in Shrewsbury to a four-year high school program
 Creating a four-year college program in Shrewsbury, later called Cardinal Glennon College

Facing increased seminary enrollment in the 1960s, Ritter opened a second high school seminary in Florissant, Missouri, called Saint Louis Preparatory Seminary North.  The original high school program in Shrewsbury was now called Saint Louis Preparatory Seminary South.  With drops in enrollment in the 1980s, Archbishop John L. May was forced to consolidate the seminary facilities in 1986 and 1987.

 Kenrick Seminary moved to the Cardinal Glennon College building
 Cardinal Glennon College ended its undergraduate program.  Students would now attend classes for the first two years of college at Saint Louis University, the second two years at Cardinal Glennon
 Saint Louis Preparatory Seminary North was closed.  The Shrewsbury campus was again called Saint Louis Preparatory Seminary.

In 1991, more shrinking enrollment forced May to close Saint Louis Preparatory Seminary in Shrewsbury, ending the high school seminary program for the archdiocese.  This left Kenrick School of Theology and Cardinal Glennon College, both now operating under the name of Kenrick–Glennon Seminary.

21st century 
In November 2016, the Archdiocese of St. Louis settled a lawsuit involving the sexual abuse of a minor at a summer camp run by  Kenrick–Glennon Seminary.  The plaintiffs were Dan and Pat Harkins, the parents of Alex Harkins.  In 2009, Alex told his parents that he had been sexually abused by Bryan Kuchar, an archdiocese priest, when he was 12 to 14 years old. Alex committed suicide in 2009 and the parents sued in 2013.  Convicted of sexual abuse in a different 2003 case, Kuchar was defrocked in 2006.

In 2018,  Saint Louis University integrated the Kenrick-Glennon undergraduate program into the university's program.  Graduates would now receive a bachelor's degree from Saint Louis University instead of Kenrick-Glennon.

In 2021, Kenrick-Glennon committed to following a set of five sexual misconduct policy benchmarks for seminaries that was created by a working group at the University of Notre Dame.

References

External links 
Official website

Roman Catholic Archdiocese of St. Louis
Catholic seminaries in the United States
Universities and colleges in St. Louis County, Missouri
Educational institutions established in 1818
Catholic universities and colleges in Missouri
Buildings and structures in St. Louis County, Missouri
1818 establishments in Missouri Territory